Thomas Jacob Leinenkugel (born February 18, 1952) is an American businessman and politician, currently serving as the Chairman of the United States Creating Options for Veterans' Expedited Recovery (COVER) Commission. He was appointed to the role by President Donald Trump in June 2018.

Early life and education 
Leinenkugel attended the University of Wisconsin–Madison from 1971 to 1975 and received a bachelor's degree in business management at Pepperdine University in 1979. After college, Leinenkugel served six years in the Marine Corps and left with the rank of Captain.

Career 
In 1982, he began working as a sales manager and marketing director within his family's beer company, the Jacob Leinenkugel Brewing Company. He served as the president of the company from 1988 until his retirement in 2014.

In 2017, Leinenkugel was named as senior White House adviser for the United States Department of Veterans Affairs.

Leinenkugel has served on the boards of Marshfield Clinic, Wisconsin Labor Management Council, Momentum Chippewa Valley, St. Joseph and Sacred Heart Hospitals, Casper Foundation, and United Way. He is also a member of the U.S. Marine Corps Reserve Officer Association.

References 

1952 births
Living people
People from Chippewa Falls, Wisconsin
Military personnel from Wisconsin
University of Wisconsin–Madison alumni
Pepperdine University alumni
American brewers
Trump administration personnel